Zakai is a surname. Notable people with the surname include:

Johanan ben Zakai, Mishnah rabbi
Moshe Zakai (born 1926), Israeli scientist
Shafrira Zakai (born 1932), Israeli translator
Shmuel Zakai (born 1963), Israeli general
Yehezkel Zakai (born 1932), Israeli politician